Typhoon Ida, known in the Japan as Makurazaki Typhoon (枕崎台風), was a powerful and deadly typhoon which hit Japan in 1945, causing over 2000 deaths.

Overview 

Ida made landfall near Makurazaki in Kagoshima Prefecture on September 17. This reading makes the storm responsible for the second lowest pressure ever recorded in mainland Japan, after the 1934 Muroto typhoon.

More than 2,000 people were killed in the Hiroshima Prefecture after heavy rains brought by a weakening Ida caused severe landslides.  The storm occurred just days after Japan surrendered after the Pacific War, and the damage caused by Ida worsened the situation.

In addition, USS Repose (AH-16) reportedly entered Ida's eye and observed an atmospheric pressure of 25.55 inches of mercury (about 865 hPa). This is below the Typhoon Tip (870 hPa) in 1979, the official world record for minimum sea level pressure.

References 

History of Kagoshima Prefecture
History of Hiroshima Prefecture
1945 in Japan
Typhoons in Japan
1940s Pacific typhoon seasons